Tarenorerer, also known as Walyer, Waloa, or Walloa (1800 – 5 June 1831), was a rebel leader of the Indigenous Australians in Tasmania. Between 1828 and 1830, she led a guerrilla band of indigenous people of both sexes against the British colonists in Tasmania during the Black War.

Early life
Tarenorerer was born in circa 1800 near Emu Bay, Van Diemen's Land as a member of the Tommeginne people. As a teenager, she was taken captive by Indigenous kidnappers and sold as a slave to white colonists in the Bass Strait Islands. During her captivity, she learned to speak English and how to use firearms. Two of her brothers and two of her sisters joined her with the sealers.

Resistance
In 1828, she was able to return to northern Tasmania, where she gathered a guerrilla band of Indigenous warriors of both sexes and lead them against the colonists. As she was able to train them in using firearms, they were successful. George Augustus Robinson referred to her as an Amazon and was very concerned about her ability to incite a revolution. Tarenorerer escaped to Port Sorell with her brothers Linnetower and Line-ne-like-kayver and two sisters but was captured by sealers and taken to the Hunter Islands. They were then taken to Bird Island to catch seals and mutton birds.

In December 1830 she was taken to Swan Island, where her identity was revealed. Her capture, Robinson said, was 'a matter of considerable importance to the peace and tranquility of those districts where she and her formidable coadjutors had made themselves so conspicuous in their wanton and barbarous aggression'. She was imprisoned at the Gun Carriage (Vansittart) Island, where she fell sick and died of influenza in prison.

See also 
 Australian frontier wars

References

Further reading 

 
 N. J. B. Plomley, Friendly Mission (Hobart, 1966)
 D. Lowe, Forgotten Rebels (Melbourne, 1994)
 , book 6 of Living with the Land
 
 Papers and Proceedings, Tasmanian Historical Research Association, vol 5, no 4, 1957, p 73, and vol 23, no 2, June 1976, p 26.

1800 births
1831 deaths
Women in 19th-century warfare
19th-century Australian people
Women in war in Oceania
Australian guerrillas
Resistance to colonialism in Australia
Indigenous Tasmanian people
Rebel slaves
19th-century Australian women
19th-century slaves
19th-century rebels